John Beavor-Webb (1849 - March 11, 1927) was a British and American naval architect. He was a designer of sailing yachts, including Partridge 1885, a UK National Historic Ship  and the America's Cup challengers Genesta (1884) and Galatea (1885).  John Beavor-Webb began his career in England but later worked in the U.S.A. where he designed very large steamyachts  like J.P. Morgan's Corsair II (1891) and Corsair III (1899).

Beavor-Webb was worth "more than $20,000" by the time of his death. His widow was disinherited but his three daughters each received a trust fund with an income for life.

References

1849 births
1927 deaths
American yacht designers
British yacht designers
Irish emigrants to the United States (before 1923)
American naval architects